Catamacta alopecana is a species of moth of the family Tortricidae. It is found in New Zealand.

The larvae feed on Phyllocladus aspleniifolius var. alpinus.

References

Archipini
Moths described in 1885
Moths of New Zealand
Taxa named by Edward Meyrick